Slut, Munsö is a village (smaller locality) in Ekerö Municipality, Stockholm County, southeastern Sweden. The name probably refers to a promontory on which the village is situated. Munsö is a village and a former island in Ekerö Municipality, Sweden which, because of post-glacial rebound, is now connected to the island Ekerö. The village is located on the edge of Lake Mälaren. There is a daily bus connection from Brommaplan, line 311.

References

Populated places in Ekerö Municipality
Uppland